Martin Klebba (born June 23, 1969) is an American actor and stunt performer. Klebba is best known for his role as Marty in the Pirates of the Caribbean franchise.

Personal life
Klebba was born and grew up in Troy, Michigan, graduating from Athens High School.

, Martin was engaged to Michelle Dilgard, mentioning in an interview that in his free time, he likes to play video games with his son when he visits and spend time with his fiancée. Martin is the father of son Alec and daughter Makenzie.

Klebba runs a nonprofit foundation called Coalition for Dwarf Advocacy, which gives 100% of its donations to the cause of helping little people.

Career

Early career
Klebba was an occasional guest on The Howard Stern Show in the 1990s, and was given the nickname "Marty the Midget".

Film
Martin Klebba has acted in various productions, most notably the Pirates of the Caribbean series as Marty, a dwarf pirate member of Captain Jack Sparrow's crew in Pirates of the Caribbean: The Curse of the Black Pearl. The character was originally named "Dirk," but someone, possibly director Gore Verbinski, preferred the actor's real name instead. Klebba reprised his role in the sequels Dead Man's Chest, At World's End, and Dead Men Tell No Tales. On the role, Klebba was quoted in saying he's a normal guy who fell into the franchise, one stunt turned into four out of five movies.

In 2003, Klebba played the ring announcer in the Cradle 2 the Grave. In 2009, Klebba played the role of "Count Le Petite" in All's Faire in Love, a romantic comedy set at a Renaissance fair. He has also been in low budget horror/comedy films Feast II: Sloppy Seconds & Feast III: The Happy Finish as "Thunder."

He has numerous stunt credits as well including Hancock, Zombieland, Bedtime Stories, Evan Almighty, Meet the Spartans, Epic Movie, and Van Helsing. Wearing motion capture pajamas, "Marty" stood in for the Dimorphodon who grapples with Chris Pratt in Jurassic World.

Television
Klebba starred as Friday, one of the seven dwarfs, in the 2001 made-for-TV film Snow White: The Fairest of Them All. In 2003, Klebba starred as Hank Dingo in the Comedy Central made-for-TV movie Knee High P.I.. He also made an appearance as a demon in the Charmed, season 6 episode Witch Wars (2004). He has also appeared in iCarly and Drake & Josh as Nug Nug.

Klebba made many appearances as Randall Winston in the  television series Scrubs. He starred in the CSI: Crime Scene Investigation episode "The Chick Chop Flick Shop" (2007) as Dickie Jones, and in the CSI: NY episode "Uncertainty Rules" (2010) as Calvin Moore. Also in 2010, Klebba guest starred as Hibachi in Pair of Kings, a Disney TV series. He played Todd Moore in the Bones (TV series) season 5 episode "Dwarf in the Dirt"' (2010).

Klebba has also been featured on the TLC reality show, Little People, Big World, with his good friend Amy Roloff. He will be featured in one episode of VH-1's I'm Married to a... in which his average sized wife talks about being married to a little person.

In 2011, Klebba appeared on The Cape as a series regular named "Rollo". He also appeared once again in Mirror Mirror (2012), which starred Julia Roberts, Armie Hammer, and Lily Collins.

Filmography

References

External links
 

1969 births
Male actors from Michigan
Actors with dwarfism
American male film actors
American male television actors
People from Troy, Michigan
21st-century American male actors
American stunt performers
Living people